Samira Magroun (born 24 January 1987) is a Tunisian actress.

Biography
Magroun has several sisters. As a child, she was interested in becoming an actress and was contacted for several commercials, but did not pursue it. Magroun studied English after high school. She subsequently attended flight attendant school and was recruited by Nouvel Air before embarking on her acting career.

Magroun got her start in show business in Dlilek Mlak, the Tunisian version of Deal or No Deal, in 2007. After the show ended, she was contacted by Sami Fehri about a new soap opera he was working on, but he did not offer her a leading role at first. Fehri was pleasantly surprised by Magroun's performance, and she was chosen for the role of Syrine in Maktoub, which began in 2008. Her character is a naive woman who is manipulated by her possessive fiancé, Elyes, and Magroun stated that girls like her are abundant in society.

In 2010, Magroun starred in the sitcom Garage Lekrik as Lobna, a materialistic girl who has a confused relationship with Boulouna, played by Lotfi Abdelli. When she was offered the role, she accepted it immediately because it was a good opportunity and the cast had good actors. In September 2010, Magroun starred in the Syrian TV series Takht Charki written by Yam Mach'hadi and directed by Racha Chabartji.

Magroun got engaged to the footballer Adel Chedli in April 2012. She gave birth to a son by Chedli, Koussay. The pair were married for two years before getting divorced. In May 2020, Magroun gave birth to her second child, daughter Zayna from her second marriage with a British Pakistani businessman zayn .

Filmography

Cinema
 2015 : Karam El-King by Hazem Fouda & Sofi Haddad

Television

Tunisian TV Serials
 2008-2014 : Maktoub (Destiny) by Sami Fehri : Cyrine
 2010 : Garage Lekrik by Ridha Behi : Lobna
 2013 : Allô Maa by Kais Chekir
 2019 : Ali Chouerreb (season 2) by Madih Belaid et Rabii Tekali : Zlaikha
 2021 : Inchallah Mabrouk by Bassem Hamraoui : Hasna 
 2022 : el Foundou 2 ( Saoussen jemni)

Foreign TV serials
 2010 : Takht Charki by Racha Chabartji
 2010 : Dhakiret El Jassad by Najdat Ismail Anzour
 2015 : Baad El Bedaya by Ahmed Khaled Moussa
 2016 : Waad by Ibrahim Fakhar 
 2016 : Abu el banat by Raouf Abdelaziz 
 2015 : tareequy ( طريقي ( by Mohamed Shaker 
 2016 : Elkabret Elahmar ( الكبريت الاحمر ( by khairy bechara and seif youssef 
 2018 : Elkabret Elahmar 2 ) كارما ( by issam Chammaa 
 2018 : Rassayel ( رسايل ( by Ibrahim Fakhr 
 2019 : zelzal ( زلزال ( by Ibrahim Fakhr 
 2018 : Jeeran ( جيران ( by Amer Fahd

TV Shows
 2007 : Dlilek Mlak on Tunisie 7 with Sami fehri
 2014 : Taxi 2 on Nessma

References

External links
Samira Magroun at the Internet Movie Database

1987 births
Living people
21st-century Tunisian actresses
Tunisian film actresses
Tunisian television actresses